Yacumama (South America) – Sea monster
 Yacuruna (Indigenous people of the Amazon) – Mythical water people, with backwards heads and feet 
 Yadōkai (Japanese) – Malevolent, nocturnal spirit
 Yagyō-san (Japanese) – Demon who rides through the night on a headless horse
 Yaksha (Buddhist, Hindu, and Jainism) – Male nature spirit
 Yakshi (Keralite) – Vampire
 Yakshini (Buddhist, Hindu, and Jainism) – Female nature spirit
 Yakubyō-gami (Japanese) – Disease and misfortune spirit
 Yale (Medieval Bestiaries) – Antelope- or goat-like animal with swiveling horns
 Yali (Hinduism) – Lion like creature often symbolic for protecting temples
 Yallery-Brown (English) – Nature spirit
 Yama (Yama (East Asia and India)) – Wrathful god
 Yama-biko (Japanese) – Echo spirit
 Yama-bito (Japanese) – Savage, mountain-dwelling humanoid
 Yama-chichi (Japanese) – Monkey-like mountain spirit
 Yama-inu (Japanese) – Dog-like mountain spirit
 Yama-otoko (Japanese) – Mountain giant
 Yamata no Orochi (Japanese) – Gigantic, eight-headed serpent
 Yama-uba (Japanese) – Malevolent, mountain-dwelling hag
 Yama-waro (Japanese) – Hairy, one-eyed spirit
 Yanari (Japanese) – Spirit which causes strange noises
 Yaoguai (Chinese) – Animalistic demon or fallen gods
 Yara-ma-yha-who (Australian Aboriginal) – Diminutive, sucker-fingered vampire
 Yatagarasu (Japanese) – Three-legged crow of Amaterasu
 Yato-no-kami (Japanese) – Serpent spirits
 Yeth hound (English) – Headless dog
 Yeti (Himalayan) – Mountain bigfoot
 Yilbegän (Turkic) – Either a dragon or a giant
 Yobuko (Japanese) – Mountain dwelling spirit
 Yōkai (Japanese) – Supernatural monster
 Yomotsu-shikome (Japanese) – Underworld hag
 Yong – Korean dragon
 Yōsei (Japanese) – Fairy
 Yosuzume (Japanese) – Mysterious bird that sings at night, sometimes indicating that the okuri-inu is near
 You Hun Ye Gui (Chinese) – Wandering ghost
 Yowie (Australian Aboriginal) – Nocturnal human-ape hybrid, also Yahoo
 Ypotryll (Heraldic) – Boar-camel-ox-serpent hybrid
 Yuan Gui (Chinese) – Distressed ghost
 Yukinko (Japanese) – Childlike snow spirit
 Yuki-onna (Japanese) – Female snow spirit
 Yūrei (Japanese) – Ghost
 Yuxa (Tatar) – 100-year-old snake that transforms into a beautiful human

Y